Emily Margaret MacRae (born March 30, 1989) is a Canadian curler from Fredericton, New Brunswick.

Career
In 2007, MacRae represented Nova Scotia at the 2007 Canada Winter Games as lead for Katherine Hines. The team went 4–2 in the round robin, before losing in a tiebreaker to Saskatchewan 12–3.

MacRae won the New Brunswick Junior Championship in 2009 as lead for Ashley Howard. At the 2009 Canadian Junior Curling Championships, the team finished with a 5–7 record. She also won the 2011 Rodd Curling Classic on the World Curling Tour.

MacRae, playing lead for Shannon Tatlock, made the playoffs at provincials for the first time at the 2015 New Brunswick Scotties Tournament of Hearts where they lost in the semifinal to Melissa Adams. They made the playoffs the following year as well, but lost in the 3 vs 4 page playoff game.

Personal life
MacRae is originally from Fall River, Nova Scotia. She began curling when she was ten years old at the Mayflower Curling Club. She later moved to Truro, Nova Scotia and currently works as a Sales manager.

Teams

References

External links

Curlers from New Brunswick
Curlers from Nova Scotia
Living people
Sportspeople from Fredericton
1989 births
Canadian women curlers
Sportspeople from Halifax, Nova Scotia
People from Truro, Nova Scotia